Kristine Vanessa Tadiwan Chiong is a Filipina politician from Naga, Cebu, Philippines. She previously served as the mayor of Naga from 2016 to 2019 and 2020 to 2022. She ran as vice mayor in the 2019 elections and won together with her father, Valdemar Chiong. She assumed the mayoral position after the elder Chiong announced his resignation effective on March 16, 2020.

References

External links 

Living people
Nacionalista Party politicians
Year of birth missing (living people)